Mini Schwiiz, mini Heimat is the tenth studio album by Swiss singer Beatrice Egli. It was released by Universal Music on 14 August 2020 in Switzerland. The album debuted and peaked at number one on the Swiss Albums Chart.

Track listing
All tracks produced by Joachim Hans Wolf.

Charts

Weekly charts

Year-end charts

Release history

References

2020 albums
Beatrice Egli albums